New Age of Earth is a solo album by Manuel Göttsching. While originally released under Göttsching's name and Ash Ra Tempel in 1976, the releases that followed in 1977 and onward were under the name Ashra. It was the first album to be released under the name Ashra. Although a solo album by Manuel Göttsching recorded after the dissolution of his band Ash Ra Tempel, Ashra later evolved into a full band. It was released in 1976 on Isadora Records. New Age of Earth has been listed as one of the Top 25 Most Influential Ambient Albums of All Time. In 2016, Pitchfork (website) ranked it #31 on their list of the 50 Best Ambient Albums of All Time.

Track listing
Sunrain – 7:26
Ocean of Tenderness – 12:36
Deep Distance – 5:46
Nightdust – 21:50

Personnel
 Manuel Göttsching - ARP Odyssey, Farfisa Syntorchestra, EMS Synthi A, EKO Computerhythm, Gibson SG Guitar

References

1976 albums
Ashra (band) albums
Space music albums by German artists